Psycho A-Go-Go (also known as Echo of Terror) is a 1965 crime thriller directed by Al Adamson, starring Roy Morton and distributed by Hemisphere Pictures. The film was originally a straight action thriller, about a psychotic jewel thief who stalks a young woman and her child into the wilderness to get back some stolen jewels hidden in the child's doll. There were a number of musical nightclub scenes in the film, as director Adamson was trying to promote actress Tacey Robbins' singing career at the time. Al Adamson played a cameo in the film, playing one of the jewel thieves who gets shot to death on a rooftop by one of his own cohorts.

Plot
A psychotic young man named Joe Corey (Roy Morton) participates in a diamond heist with some friends, and kills one of his own cohorts during their escape. Corey hides the stolen diamonds in a pickup truck, where a little girl finds them and hides them inside her doll. The little girl who owns the doll and her mother set off on a trip to a national park with the doll in their car. Corey and his fellow thieves beat up the little girl's father in his home, thinking he has the jewels hidden somewhere in the house, but eventually they realize he knows nothing. Corey lures a sexy nightclub singer, who was friends with the little girl's mother, to a motel room where he forces her to tell him where the little girl and her mother went on their vacation, before brutally murdering her.

Corey pursues the girl and her mother into the snow-covered wilderness to retrieve the missing loot. The little girl's father, who has recovered from his beating, follows them into the woods with a police detective to try to intercept Joe Corey before he can harm his family. Corey winds up getting shot by the policeman, and plunges off a cliff, clutching the girl's doll and the jewels in his hands as his life slips away.

Cast 
 Roy Morton - as Joe Corey
 Tacey Robbins as Linda, the child's mother
 K. K. Riddle as Nancy the child
 Kirk Duncan as Dave
 John Talbert as Curtis
 Lyle Felice as Vito

Production and History

In 1969, Psycho A-Go-Go was completely re-edited, with additional footage featuring actor John Carradine as a mad scientist added, and the film was re-released by American General as The Fiend with the Electronic Brain.

Still not satisfied with the result, in 1971 Adamson added still more new footage featuring actors Kent Taylor, Tommy Kirk and Regina Carrol, and re-edited the whole thing into an entirely different film titled Blood of Ghastly Horror. The confusing result, a patchwork film consisting of footage taken from three different variations, was theatrically distributed by Adamson's company Independent-International. It was also later released to late-night television under yet another title, The Man With the Synthetic Brain, with the violent nightclub singer's murder scene excised.

The original 1965 version of Psycho A-Go-Go still exists today and has been released on DVD by Troma Pictures, with an introduction by Sam Sherman.

References

External links

1965 films
1960s crime thriller films
1960s English-language films
Films directed by Al Adamson